Ross O'Carroll-Kelly is a satirical fictional Irish character, a wealthy South County Dublin rugby union jock created by journalist Paul Howard. The character first appeared in a January 1998 column in the Sunday Tribune newspaper and later transferred to The Irish Times. The series comprises twenty-one novels, three plays, a CD, two other books, a weekly podcast, and the newspaper column, as of 2023.

Works in the series

Language 

The novels are written entirely from Ross's first-person perspective, written in an eye dialect representative of the intonation attributed to affluent areas of South Dublin, commonly called "Dortspeak" (after the DART, a rail service covering the Dublin coast). This accent is one of the primary targets of satire in the columns and novels. Due to the wide variety of esoteric slang used in the novels, a glossary ("ThesauRoss") appears as an appendix to Ross O'Carroll-Kelly's Guide to (South) Dublin: How To Get By On, Like, €10,000 A Day. Though the basic idioms are derived largely from standard Hiberno-English, the South Dublin accent as represented by Howard has distinctive features:
 "Car" is written as "cor", "Arts" as "Orts", "star" as "stor", "fuck" as "fock", and "right" as "roysh".
 The "aspirated T" or "soft T" prevails: "right" becomes "roysh", "DART" becomes "Dorsh".
 A form of rhyming slang is used: A taxi is a "Jo Maxi" (or simply a "Jo"), a face is a "boat race", breasts are "top tens" (Top Ten hits – tits) and a love-bite is a "Denis" (Denis Hickie). Ross often refers to having an "Allied Irish" (Allied Irish Banks: "wank"). "Padraig Pearse", "fierce".
 Other forms of wordplay (occasionally employing equally obscure references) are also common. For example, a girl who has "fallen to the communists", has "Munster playing at home" or has won a "starring role in a period costume drama" is (or is speculated to be) having her period.
 Ross, in particular, describes women by comparing them to female celebrities. For example, "A total Ali Landry", "A bit of a girl-next-door vibe, if your next door neighbour happens to be Cheryl Tweedy".
 Ugly women are often referred to as "moonpigs" or "swamp donkeys".

Although the main satirical targets of the columns are affluent South Dublin dwellers, elements of working-class culture (sometimes called skanger culture) are also parodied, again, primarily through language.
 Common exclamations include "Ah Jaysus!", and "(Wat's de) Story, bud?" (meaning "How are you?").
 The 'th' sound becomes a 'd' sound: "Wudja looka dat young fella over dare" ("Would you look at that young man over there").
 "The Herald" becomes "De Heddild", "aren't" becomes "arden't", and crime figure "The General" becomes "de Generodle".
 Working-class people are sometimes referred to by Ross as "Howiyas" (based on the Dublin accent rendering of "How are you?"), and the women as "Jacintas", "Anitas" (pronounced as Anee-eh) or "Natalies" (names perceived to be common among working class Dublin women).
 The term "steamer" is a phrase used by Ross referring to a guy who "bats for the other team" or "drives on the wrong side of the road" i.e.: is homosexual.

Eye dialect is also used to portray the accents of people from Northern Ireland, "culchies" (rural people), and foreigners.

Characters

Cultural impact 
Ross O'Carroll-Kelly was something of a craze in Ireland, and his name has become a byword for all that is perceived to be wrong in Celtic Tiger Ireland. Though it is largely viewed as satire, there are those who view Ross O'Carroll-Kelly as a role model or an idol. Paul Howard has claimed some people have imitated Ross's friends pastime of driving through disadvantaged areas in expensive cars, shouting "Affluence!" at passers-by and throwing €5 notes out the window. Following Ross's move to The Irish Times, the Irish Independent began a similar column, OMG! featuring a female counterpart to Ross, in its Weekend supplement on 22 September 2007.

References

External links 
 Official site

 
Characters in novels of the 20th century
Characters in novels of the 21st century
Literary characters introduced in 1998
Fictional Irish people
Novel series
Irish satirical novels
Characters in Irish novels
Fictional real estate brokers
Male characters in literature
Comedy literature characters